The Fort Worth Botanic Garden is a botanical garden located at 3220 Botanic Garden Boulevard, Fort Worth, Texas. The garden was established in 1934 and is the oldest major botanic garden in Texas. It is located in the heart of the cultural district.

History and organisation
The botanic garden started with development of the 37.5-acre Rock Springs Park in 1912 involving natural springs, streams and rock features. This was completed for the opening of the botanic garden in 1934. This area was redeveloped from 2013 as the Tinsley Rock Springs Garden, restoring the water features and re-planting with plants native to north Texas.

In 2011 new buildings for the Botanical Research Institute of Texas were opened adjacent to the botanic garden.

Features
In addition to wooded areas, major garden features include:

 Back Yard Vegetable Garden - Vegetable garden that hosts many educational programs. 
 Conservatory (10,000 square feet) - tropical displays of orchids, bromeliads, and trees.
 Four Seasons Garden - Hundreds of iris, daylily, and chrysanthemum varieties.
 Fragrance Garden - small garden build for the seeing impaired with fragrant plants and fountain.
 Fuller Garden - pathways and lawn; site for weddings and garden parties.
 Japanese Garden (7 acres; established 1973) - the Fort Worth Japanese Garden, with three koi ponds, waterfalls, bridges, teahouse, pagodas, pavilions, zen garden, cherry trees, and Japanese maples.
 Lower Rose Garden - rose garden inspired by Villa Lante (Italy).
 Native Texas Boardwalk - A raised path through the trees with educational information along the way.  
 Oval Rose Garden - hundreds of roses; renovated 2002.
 Perennial Garden - perennials with culinary herb collection, as well as ponds and small waterfall.
 Rock Springs - Elevated pathways, and bridges over ponds and streams.  
 Trial Garden - evaluation site for hundreds of species of perennials.
 Water Conservation Garden - demonstration xeriscape garden.
 Water Wise Entrance - entry garden with agave, Texas sage, salvia greggii, Mexican Bush sage, red yucca and Esparanza.

The garden also contains a Begonia Species Bank, established and operated to prevent the loss of begonia species. This is the largest begonia collection in the United States.

Photo gallery

See also

List of botanical gardens in the United States
National Register of Historic Places listings in Tarrant County, Texas

References

External links

AABGA Historic Landscapes Committee Networking Guide to Historic Landscape Resources Survey Form

National Register of Historic Places in Fort Worth, Texas
Culture of Fort Worth, Texas
Parks in Fort Worth, Texas
Botanical gardens in Texas
Economy of Fort Worth, Texas
1934 establishments in Texas